The Zurich Street Circuit was a street circuit located in Swiss city of Zurich, used for the Zürich ePrix of the Formula E Championship, and held its first race, as well as the first Swiss motor race since 1954, the 2018 Zürich ePrix on 10 June 2018.

History 
Preparations for a Formula E race in Switzerland commenced in March 2015 when the Council of States backed a motion put forward by the National Councillor Fathi Derder to exempt electric car racing from a long-standing ban on motor racing in the country. The motion was adopted by the Federal Council in December, allowing electric vehicles to race in Switzerland starting from 1 April 2016 pending authorisation from local authorities with regards to the maximum speeds allowed. Subsequently on 21 September 2017, the Zurich ePrix was then announced to be added to the Calendar of the 2017-18 FIA Formula E Championship. The final track design was revealed on 3 April 2018.

Circuit layout 

The track featured a mix of surfaces, with asphalt and concrete, and crosses several tramlines, some of which were filled for the event.

References 

Zürich ePrix
Formula E circuits
Defunct motorsport venues
Motorsport venues in Switzerland